The lateral cervical lymph nodes are a group of lymph nodes found in the lateral side of the neck.

Terminologia Anatomica divides them into:
 Superficial lateral cervical lymph nodes
 Deep lateral cervical lymph nodes

Another source divides this group into "internal jugular", "spinal accessory", and "transverse cervical".

References

Lymphatics of the head and neck